The Steve Largent Award is given by the Seattle Seahawks annually to the team contributor(s) best exemplifying the spirit, dedication, and integrity of former Seahawk wide receiver Steve Largent.

Recipients

References

National Football League trophies and awards
Seattle Seahawks